Chorismic acid, more commonly known as its anionic form chorismate, is an important biochemical intermediate in plants and microorganisms. It is a precursor for:
 The aromatic amino acids phenylalanine, tryptophan, and tyrosine
 Indole, indole derivatives and tryptophan
 2,3-Dihydroxybenzoic acid (DHB) used for enterobactin biosynthesis
 The plant hormone salicylic acid
 Many alkaloids and other aromatic metabolites.
The folate precursor para-aminobenzoate (pABA)
 The biosynthesis of vitamin K and folate in plants and microorganisms.

The name chorismic acid derives from a classical Greek word  meaning "to separate", because the compound plays a role as a branch-point in aromatic amino acid biosynthesis.

Biosynthesis 
Shikimate → shikimate-3-phosphate → 5-enolpyruvylshikimate-3-phosphate (5-O-(1-carboxyvinyl)-3-phosphoshikimate)

Chorismate synthase is an enzyme that catalyzes the final chemical reaction:
5-O-(1-carboxyvinyl)-3-phosphoshikimate → chorismate + phosphate.

Metabolism 
Chorismate is transformed into para-aminobenzoic acid by the enzymes 4-amino-4-deoxychorismate synthase and 4-amino-4-deoxychorismate lyase.

Chorismate lyase is an enzyme that transforms chorismate into 4-hydroxybenzoate and pyruvate. This enzyme catalyses the first step in ubiquinone biosynthesis in Escherichia coli and other Gram-negative bacteria.

See also
 C10H10O6
 Salicylate synthase

References

External links 
Shikimate and chorismate biosynthesis

Cyclohexadienes
Dicarboxylic acids
Secondary alcohols
Ethers